Serhiy Oleksiyovych Prychynenko (born 2 April 1960) is a former Ukrainian football player.

His son Denis Prychynenko, his twin brother Volodymyr Prychynenko and nephew Stanislav Prychynenko (Volodymyr's son) were all professional footballers.

References

1960 births
Twin sportspeople
People from Pryluky
Living people
Soviet footballers
FC Desna Chernihiv players
SC Tavriya Simferopol players
PFC CSKA Moscow players
Soviet expatriate footballers
Soviet expatriate sportspeople in East Germany
Soviet expatriate sportspeople in Germany
Expatriate footballers in East Germany
Expatriate footballers in Germany
Ukrainian expatriate footballers
Ukrainian expatriate sportspeople in Germany
Ukrainian footballers
DDR-Oberliga players
Association football midfielders
Sportspeople from Chernihiv Oblast